These are the results of the men's K-1 10000 metres competition in canoeing at the 1948 Summer Olympics.  The K-1 event is raced by single-man canoe sprint kayaks.

Medalists

Final
The final took place on August 11.

References

1948 Summer Olympics official report. p. 311.
Sports reference.com 1948 K-1 10000 m results

Men's K-1 10000
Men's events at the 1948 Summer Olympics